Association of international and national public organizations «CHILD.UA»   is a coalition of public and charitable organizations based in Ukraine working for the protection of children's rights, development of creative youth as well as providing support to volunteer battalions and families of refugees. The association is included in the register of the National Social Service of Ukraine, which attracts volunteers, including foreigners. The organization was founded and headed by President Eugenia Tymoshenko.

History 

The CHILD.UA Association started its activities with the Poglyad charity organization, which has been helping street children since 1999. Volunteers of the charity found children in basements, sewers, heating mains and provided them with assistance: treated, organized meals in canteens and organized picnics with entertainment. Volunteers started social work with parents of children who found themselves in difficult life circumstances, as well as with children from orphanages and boarding schools.

On 13 September 2004, International charitable organization "Poglyad" was officially registered. The organization’s mission is to help socially disadvantaged children to build a decent life and future. On 20 June 2008 International NGO "Follow your Dream" was registered. The mission of the organization is to support talented children and youth, to create social environment favorable for education of a personality with a high level of creativity. On 24 April 2014 International charitable foundation "Resistance Movement" was established. The organization’s mission is to provide assistance to those who fight for Ukraine’s territorial integrity and sovereignty.

During the escalation of the war with Russia in the Donbas, Yevhenia Tymoshenko on the International Day of Peace founded and organized "The Voice of Peace", a charitable marathon in Ukraine that unites media, business, artists and public figures to volunteer to help former battalions and refugees.

The groups "Follow Your Dream", "Insight", "The Voice of Peace", "Resistance Movement" together with  "The Territory of Childhood" and "Ukrainian center of social adaptation for youth" have since joined together to form Association of international and national public organizations "Social protection".

In February 2018, the name of the Association was changed from "Social Protection" to "CHILD.UA".

Activities and charity 

 International Charity Festival of Children's Creativity "Follow Your Dream", that was founded in 2007, is held for children from orphanages and boarding schools every summer under the patronage of the President of Association "Social protection" Eugenia Tymoshenko.
 International Charitable Foundation "Resistance Movement" was established on 24 April 2014 to help defenders of Ukraine who fight for the territorial integrity and sovereignty of Ukraine. The Foundation was established by Yulia Tymoshenko, the head of political party "Batkivshchyna" (Motherland). Since the beginning of the military conflict until today 35 mln. UAH have been transferred for the different needs of Ukrainian defenders. The Foundation "Resistance Movement" has spent the donations on uniforms and protective equipment for battalions "Motherland", "Resistance Movement", "Azov", "Aydar": thermal imaging cameras, diesel generators, radio sets, relay stations, tactical sunglasses, tactical vests, body armour, NATO first aid kits, waterproof capes, two combat vehicles, a Grand Cherokee Jeep, a Mercedes Sprinter minivan, warm jackets, heaters, battery charger sets, clothes, personal hygiene products, helmets, binoculars, Celox and other medicines.
 On 21 September 2014, on the International Day of Peace, the Volunteer movement "The Voice of Peace" was started to help volunteer battalions, victims in the combat zone as well as children displaced from the East and the Crimea. The charitable concert for the soldiers of 34th ("Motherland") and 42nd ("Resistance Movement") volunteer battalions and Self-defense battalion was held that day. Participants of the charitable marathon visited checkpoints, provided soldiers with equipment, machinery, humanitarian aid and gave them children's drawings, self-made amulets and letters of support.
 23 October 2014: the Art Hundred and organizers of "The Voice of Peace" marathon visited Slavyansk with the charitable mission, where the 95th airmobile brigade of the Armed Forces of Ukraine is situated; provided humanitarian aid, organized a concert for the soldiers.
 11 November 2014: a charitable concert was held in Lviv Military Hospital for 600 soldiers wounded in the area of ATO. The organizers of "The Voice of Peace" marathon brought humanitarian aid, medical equipment and medicines.
 12 December 2014: the charitable marathon visited Starobilsk (Luhansk region). The Art Hundred and the organizers visited Starobilsk cemetery and commemorated 37 fallen fighters from the 80th airmobile brigade and soldiers of "Aydar" battalion. They gave a charity concert and brought humanitarian aid, blankets, boilers, insoles, building materials for shower cabins, medicines, foods, sweets, children's drawings and letters of support.
 10 December 2014 The President of the Association "Social protection" Eugenia Tymoshenko awarded the winners of the Wikipedia online contest "Writing about NATO". Eugenia Tymoshenko presented the winners tablets. She thanked all the participants for their volunteer work – they filled Wikipedia with new interesting articles about NATO, helping Ukrainians to learn more about the aims and objectives of the Alliance.
 29–30 December 2014: the organizers of "The Voice of Peace" marathon delivered Christmas gifts to soldiers of ATO in Starobilsk, Polovinkyne, Shchastia and the Luhansk TPP (thermal power station).
 28 January 2015: volunteers of "The Voice of Peace" marathon bought and delivered an ambulance car to the area of ATO; provided charitable assistance to boarding school and two kindergartens in Shchastia (Luhansk region) and schools in Artemivsk and Svitlodarsk (Luhansk region).
 13 September 2004: International Charitable Organization "Insight" was established. Organizers provided all possible assistance to low-income families in Kyiv and Kyiv region, Cherkasy and Zhytomyr region (mother-and-child home in Pochuiky village), Zaporizhzhya, Mykolayiv and Nikopol. Provided assistance to families displaced from the combat area in Eastern Ukraine. On an ongoing basis organization holds "Tvory Dobro" ("Do Good") charitable events to collect food and household products in the network of supermarkets "Velyka Kyshenya".
 In October 2015, the United Nations, namely the Department of Economic and Social Affairs, accredited the CHILD.UA Association and entered it into the database of all accredited civil society organizations.
 On 3 April 2016, in honor of the World Autism Awareness Day, the first charity football match "Parliamentary Cup" between the National Assembly of People's Deputies and the National Team of Journalists of Ukraine took place in Kyiv. The sports event was held by the Association "CHILD.UA", the Football Federation of Ukraine and the Charitable Foundation "Development of Football of Ukraine". The main result of the football match was a fundraiser for the creation of sensory rooms in the correctional center "Primavera" for autistic children in the amount of ₴222,000.
 On 12 March 2019, Yevhenia Tymoshenko bought and handed over special equipment for the Center for Helping Children with Autism.
 In 2020, the famous composer and pianist Evgeny Khmara together with Child.ua presented an album for children with autism.
 On 28 April 2021, the Association "CHILD.UA" was entered in the register of the National Social Service of Ukraine under number 577, as one that attracts volunteers, including foreigners.
 In the summer of 2022, the Association, in cooperation with the Global Empowerment Mission, provided humanitarian aid to residents of the Chernihiv region who suffered from the Russian invasion of Ukraine.

References

External links
 Child.ua 
 Association of international and national public organizations "Social protection" Соціальний захист | Асоціація міжнародних та всеукраїнських громадських організацій
 International NGO "Follow your dream"  [www.mriy.org ]
 International Charitable Organization "Insight"  
 International Charitable Foundation "Resistance Movement" 

Charities based in Ukraine
Humanitarian aid organizations